Geolycosa pikei is a species of wolf spider in the family Lycosidae from the United States. It can blend into sand, which it also burrows in. The spider can heal its wounds quickly.

Description
The spider is sandy gray to brown with black markings. As a result of its color, it is hard to see the spider on sand until it starts moving. The spider hunts at dusk by running quickly over the sand to prey on insects. 

During the day, the spider stays in its hole unless prey comes too close. In order to stop the hole from caving in, the spider spins a silken lining around the upper  of the hole. The hole is typically built at night with the spider throwing little bits of sand. Its hole is usually built in sand near the seashore, but the holes have also been found inland. The hole is similar to that of a tiger beetle's, but it is larger. The young spiders build holes just as well as the adults. They are found in the United States.

Studies

A 1981 study by the Canadian Journal of Zoology showed that when a wound is made in the spider's abdomen, it is immediately secured with a hemolymph coagulum. As time went by, the external coagulum sealed the hole in the exoskeleton and the internal part turned into a fibrous mass. After multiple changes, the spider's tissue was restored.

References

Lycosidae
Spiders of the United States
Spiders described in 1881
Articles created by Qbugbot